The Cleveland Cavaliers (often referred to as the Cavs) are an American professional basketball team based in Cleveland. The Cavaliers compete in the National Basketball Association (NBA) as a member of the league's Eastern Conference Central Division. The team began play as an expansion team in 1970, along with the Portland Trail Blazers and Buffalo Braves. Home games were first held at Cleveland Arena from 1970 to 1974, followed by the Richfield Coliseum from 1974 to 1994. Since 1994, the Cavs have played home games at Rocket Mortgage FieldHouse in downtown Cleveland, which is shared with the Cleveland Monsters of the American Hockey League. Dan Gilbert has owned the team since March 2005.

The Cavaliers opened their inaugural season by losing their first 15 games and struggled in their early years, placing no better than sixth in the Eastern Conference during their first five seasons. The team won their first Central Division title in 1976, which also marked the first winning season and playoff appearance in franchise history, where they advanced to the Eastern Conference Finals. The franchise was purchased by Ted Stepien in 1980. Stepien's tenure as owner was marked by six coaching changes, questionable trades and draft decisions, and poor attendance, leading to $15 million in financial losses. The Cavs went 66–180 over the course of those three seasons and endured a 24-game losing streak spanning the 1981–82 and 1982–83 seasons.

George and Gordon Gund purchased the franchise in 1983. During the latter half of the 1980s and through much of the 1990s, the Cavs were a regular playoff contender – led by players such as Mark Price and Brad Daugherty – and advanced to the Eastern Conference Finals in 1992. After the team's playoff appearance in the 1997–98 season, however, the Cavs had six consecutive losing seasons with no playoff action. Cleveland was awarded with the top overall pick in the 2003 draft, and they selected LeBron James. Behind James and Zydrunas Ilgauskas, the Cavaliers again became a regular playoff contender by 2005. They made their first appearance in the NBA Finals in 2007 after winning the first Eastern Conference championship in franchise history. After failing to return to the NBA Finals in the ensuing three seasons, James joined the Miami Heat in 2010. As a result, the Cavaliers finished the 2010–11 season last in the conference, enduring a 26-game losing streak, the second-longest in NBA history. Between 2010 and 2014, however, the team won the top pick in the NBA draft lottery three times – first in 2011 where they selected Kyrie Irving, and again in 2013 and 2014.

After four seasons with the Heat and having won back-to-back titles in the 2011–12 and 2012–13 seasons, James returned to the Cavs in 2014 and led the team to four straight NBA Finals appearances. In 2016, the Cavaliers won their first NBA Championship, marking Cleveland's first major sports title since 1964. The 2016 NBA Finals victory over the Golden State Warriors marked the first time in Finals history a team had come back to win the series after trailing, 3–1. The Cavaliers have 22 playoff appearances and have won seven Central Division titles, five Eastern Conference titles and one NBA title.

History

The Cavaliers began play in the 1970–71 season as an expansion team. They set losing records in each of their first five seasons before winning their first division title in 1976. The 1976 team was led by Austin Carr, Bobby "Bingo" Smith, Jim Chones, Dick Snyder, Nate Thurmond and head coach Bill Fitch. It was remembered for the "Miracle at Richfield," in which the Cavaliers defeated the Washington Bullets, 4–3, in the Eastern Conference Semifinals. They won Game 7, 87–85, on a shot by Snyder with four seconds to go. The Cavaliers moved on to the Eastern Conference Finals for the first time, but were without Chones after he broke his toe before the series opener. As a result, the Cavaliers went on to lose, 4–2, to the Boston Celtics. They made playoff appearances in the following two seasons before a six-year playoff drought.

The early 1980s were marked by Ted Stepien's ownership. During Stepien's tenure, the Cavaliers made a practice of trading future draft picks for marginal veteran players. His most notable deal sent a 1982 first-round pick to the Los Angeles Lakers in exchange for Don Ford and the 22nd overall pick in 1980. As a result of Stepien's dealings, the NBA introduced the "Stepien Rule," which prohibits teams from trading first-round draft picks in successive seasons. The Cavaliers went 66–180, dropped to the bottom of the league in attendance and lost $15 million during Stepien's three years as the owner. The Cavs went through six coaches during this span, including four during the 1981–82 season. The team finished 15–67, and between March and November 1982, the team had a 24-game losing streak, which, at the time, was the NBA's longest losing streak. George and Gordon Gund purchased the Cavaliers from Stepien in 1983.

The Cavaliers made the playoffs 10 times between 1985 and 1998. The 1988–89 seasons was the Cavaliers' best season to date, finishing the regular season at 57–25 with a team that included Brad Daugherty, Mark Price, Ron Harper and Larry Nance, and head coach Lenny Wilkens. They had their second 57-win season in 1991–92 and reached the Eastern Conference Finals that year. However, between 1999 and 2005, the Cavaliers failed to make a playoff appearance. The Cavaliers finished the 2002–03 season 17–65, tied for the worst record in the NBA.

The Cavaliers had the No. 1 pick in the 2003 NBA draft, selecting future NBA MVP LeBron James, a native of nearby Akron. On January 3, 2005, the team was sold to businessman Dan Gilbert for $375 million, and the deal was finalized on March 1, 2005. That year, the team also hired head coach Mike Brown and general manager Danny Ferry. The Cavaliers built a team around James and Žydrūnas Ilgauskas by adding players such as Drew Gooden, Larry Hughes and Anderson Varajao. Under this new leadership, the Cavaliers made five straight playoffs from 2006 to 2010, advancing to at least the second round each time. The 2006–07 Cavaliers advanced to the franchise's first NBA Finals, but were swept by the San Antonio Spurs. The 2008–09 Cavaliers won a franchise-record 66 games, including a franchise-best 39–2 record at home, but lost the Eastern Conference Finals to the Orlando Magic. Despite the addition of four-time NBA champion Shaquille O'Neal, the 2009–10 Cavaliers were unable to return to the Eastern Conference Finals after losing to the Boston Celtics in the second round.

With the Cavaliers out of the playoffs, the focus turned to James' impending free agency. On July 8, 2010, James announced in a nationally televised one-hour special titled The Decision that he would be signing with the Miami Heat. The repercussions of this announcement left many in the city of Cleveland infuriated and feeling betrayed. After a 19–win season in 2010–11, the Cavaliers began a rebuild around Kyrie Irving, whom they selected first overall in the 2011 NBA Draft.

In 2014, James returned to the Cavaliers after four seasons in Miami. While the Heat had a 224–88 record during James' four-year tenure and won NBA titles in 2012 and 2013, the Cavaliers went 97–215 and missed the playoffs each season. The Cavaliers made several moves to build a championship-contending team around James, most notably acquiring power forward Kevin Love from the Minnesota Timberwolves, which created what many fans and media referred to as a "Big Three" with James, Love and Irving. The Lebron-led Cavaliers made four consecutive Finals appearances from 2015 to 2018 – all against the Golden State Warriors – winning in 2016. The 2016 NBA Championship marked the Cavaliers' first title in franchise history, as they became the first team to come back from a 3–1 deficit to win the Finals. It was also Cleveland's first championship in major professional sports since the 1964 Browns, signaling the end of the so-called Cleveland sports curse.

The Cavaliers' roster went through many changes in the 2017–18 season, most notably the trade of Irving to the Boston Celtics in exchange for Isaiah Thomas and other assets. Thomas was later traded to the Los Angeles Lakers as part of a trade deadline overhaul that saw the Cavaliers add Jordan Clarkson, Larry Nance Jr. (son of Cavs legend Larry Nance) and others. The following offseason, James declined his player option to rejoin the team, instead signing with the Lakers. In the following two seasons, the team recorded only 19 wins and failed to make the playoffs.

In the first three seasons since James left the second time, the Cavaliers won a total of 60 games, missed the playoffs each season and have had four different head coaches: Tyronn Lue, Larry Drew, John Beilein and current head coach J.B. Bickerstaff.

In the 2021–22 season, the Cavs finished 44–38 and eighth in the Eastern Conference, and qualified for the NBA Play-In Tournament, marking the first time the team played in the event. This also marks the team's first postseason basketball since 2017–18 and the first time a non-LeBron-led team qualified for postseason play since 1997–98. The team, however, didn't make it out of the Play-In Tournament, losing the 7-seed vs. 8-seed game to the Brooklyn Nets and the 8-seed vs. 9-seed game to the Atlanta Hawks, ending their season.

Season-by-season record
List of the last five seasons completed by the Cavaliers. For the full season-by-season history, see List of Cleveland Cavaliers seasons.

Note: GP = Games played, W = Wins, L = Losses, W–L% = Winning percentage

Rivalries

Logos and uniforms

Original wine and mustard/metallic gold
When the Cleveland Cavaliers debuted in the NBA in 1970, the team's original jersey colors were wine and gold. The first jerseys featured the feathered treatment of the letter "C" in "Cavaliers." In 1974, they changed into the classic block lettering and checkerboard pattern that was synonymous to the "Miracle of Richfield" team of 1976. In 1980, the gold shade was changed from yellowish to metallic, and the uniforms removed the checkerboard pattern and placed the stripes above "Cleveland" and below the uniform number, the only time the city name was featured in both home and away jerseys.

The original logo was that of a swashbuckling cavalier looking right with a sword pointing, surrounded by the team name and a basketball. A modernized swashbuckling cavalier logo was later used by the Cavaliers' NBA Development League affiliate, the Canton Charge. The gold checkerboard uniforms were used as throwbacks in the 2004–05 season to commemorate the 30th anniversary of the "Miracle of Richfield" team, while the gold "feathered C" uniforms were used again in the 2008–09 season as a buildup to the then-upcoming 40th season of the Cavaliers. The "Miracle of Richfield" gold uniforms were used again in the 2015–16 season on special "Hardwood Classic" nights to commemorate the Miracle of Richfield team's 40th-anniversary celebration.

Blue and orange
In the 1983–84 season, the colors were changed to burnt orange, blue and white. The first Cavaliers uniform under the new scheme featured the Cavaliers logo (with a "V" in the shape of a hoop and circle above as basketball) in an arched pattern and the player name sewn onto the back shoulder as a patch, with orange being the primary color in both the away and home uniforms. However, in the 1987–88 season, orange was relegated as a secondary color, and blue was used instead as the primary for the away and home uniforms; minor changes in the 1989–90 season include the city name on the blue away uniforms. The drop shadows were also removed. The orange version of the uniform was used again in the 2006–07 and 2016–17 seasons, as part of the respective 20th and 30th anniversaries of the 1986–87 team. The blue versions were worn in the 2009–10 season as part of the franchise's 40th anniversary and as a tribute to the 1988–89 team.

Blue, black and orange
Coinciding with the move to Gund Arena in the 1994–95 season, the Cavaliers changed logos and uniforms, adding black in addition to the already existing blue, orange and white colors. The uniforms feature a blue splash in the abdomen area in front. From 1994 to 1997, the word "CAVS" on the home uniforms was orange with black lines, while the numbers are in black with white lines; "CLEVELAND" on the road uniforms was also orange with black lines, while the numbers are in white with a black line. From 1997 to 1999, the numbers and lettering were slightly tweaked: The word "CAVS" and the numbers on the home uniforms were black with orange lines, while the word "CLEVELAND" and the numbers on the road uniforms were white with orange lines. In the latter iteration, the blue splash was moved from the right leg to the left leg, surrounding "CLEVELAND" on the home uniforms and "CAVS" on the road uniforms, with a minor change in striping.

In the 1999–2000 season, the Cavaliers opted to go for a cleaner look, eliminating the splash and adding an orange and blue line that runs through the shorts. The home jerseys feature the team nickname and the uniform numbers are in blue with black lines, while the away jerseys featured the city name and the uniform numbers in white with blue lines; these jerseys were used until the 2002–03 season. The logo used in this period was of a basketball on its way down a net, surrounded by a black square and the word "CAVS" in blue with black line below.

The 1994–96 black uniforms were revived for the 2019–20 season as part of the Cavaliers' 50th season, as well as the 25th anniversary of the move to Gund Arena (now Rocket Mortgage Fieldhouse).

Wine, metallic gold and navy
The Cavaliers switched to a modified version of the team's classic wine-and-gold scheme in the 2003–04 season: metallic gold and a crimson shade of wine with navy blue added. The home uniform was white, with the word "Cavaliers" in wine lettering with gold trim on the front, the player's name in wine lettering with gold trim on the back, the player's numbers in navy blue, and wine-and-gold trim on the sides. The team's standard road uniform was wine-colored, with the word "Cleveland," the player's name and the player's numbers all in white lettering with gold trim, as well as white and gold trim on the sides. The team's alternate jersey was navy blue with the word "Cleveland," the player's name and the player's numbers all in white lettering with gold trim, as well as a wine, gold and navy blue checkerboard trim. The checkerboard trim was a tribute to the original Cavaliers uniforms from the 1970s. The logo used was a gold sword piercing through the words "Cleveland Cavaliers" in white and navy trim, with a wine basketball surrounding it.

Wine, mustard gold and navy
The Cavaliers debuted new uniforms before the start of the 2010–11 NBA season to coincide with the team returning to the original shades of wine and gold used from 1970 to 1983. The home uniform is white with a wine-and-gold horizontal stripe trim on the collar, sleeves, waistband and pant legs, the word "CAVALIERS" (in block style lettering) in wine on the front of the jersey with wine lettering for the name and number, and white shoes and socks. The road uniform is wine-colored with the same stripe trim, "Cleveland" in gold on the front of the jersey, gold lettering on the name and number, and black shoes and socks. An alternate jersey – gold with "CAVS" in wine on the front of the jersey, wine lettering on the name and number, white socks and shoes, and the same stripe trim as the other uniforms – was added for the 2012–13 season. All uniforms have the team motto – "All for one. One for all." – stitched on the inside of the collar and the secondary "Sword C" logo on the side of the pant legs. The logo used is the same piercing sword logo, updated to the classic wine-and-gold scheme.

For the 2014–15 season, a second alternate jersey – and fourth uniform overall – was added, which is navy blue (a callback to the 1987–94 style) with "CAVS" and the player's number in wine with gold trim, the player's name on the back of the jersey in gold and the "Sword C" logo on the side of the pant legs.

Wine, mustard gold, navy and black

Two alternate jerseys were unveiled prior to the start of the 2015–16 season. The second wine uniform is similar to their regular road jersey, except that it features the arched mid-1980s Cavs logo and white numerals in gold trim. A black sleeved uniform features the wine "C" logo in front and was famously worn in the title-clinching Game 7 of the 2016 NBA Finals. Their logos for the 2017–18 season newly included the color black to commemorate the victory.

Beginning in the 2017–18 season, all NBA teams switched to Nike-designed white "Association" uniforms and "Icon" uniforms in the respective team's primary color. The Cavaliers' Icon uniforms were wine-colored with "Cleveland" across the front and the player's name in gold lettering with navy blue numerals both in the front and in the back. The white Association uniforms have "Cavs" across the front, with wine color letters and numbers both front and back. All teams have the choice of which uniform to wear for any home game. Also included on the Cavs' jerseys is a small Goodyear "Wingfoot" logo, as part of a sponsorship deal with the team.

Nike also provides a third, alternate uniform called the "Statement" uniform. The Cavaliers' Statement uniform is black with dark gray pinstripes, a wine-colored "C" trimmed in gold on the front, names in gold letters on the back, wine-colored/gold-trimmed numbers on the front and back, and gold-colored Nike and Goodyear logos on the front. In the same vein as the logo on their 2017–18 jerseys, the black jersey is a nod to the team's former black-sleeved jerseys that they wore when they won Game 7 of the 2016 Finals.

Wine, metallic gold and black

For the 2022–23 NBA season, the Cavaliers unveiled an updated logo and color scheme, removing navy blue while reverting to the metallic gold first used from 1980–83, and from 2003–10. The "C-sword" alternate logo was retired, and an updated "V-net" logo, merging the styles of the 1983–94 and 1994–2003 logos with the current typeface, was also unveiled.

With the new logo, the team also introduced three coinciding new uniforms. 

The white Association uniform features a wine-colored "V-net" logo trimmed in gold across the front, wine names and numbers trimmed in gold, and a wine primary "Cavs C" logo (outlined in gold) on left leg of the shorts.

The wine Icon uniform features "Cleveland" in gold lettering on the chest, gold names and numbers, and the "Cavs C" logo in wine with a gold outline on the left leg of the shorts.

The black Statement uniform – also a nod to the black uniforms worn during the team's 2016 NBA championship run – displays a wine "Cavs C" logo outlined in gold on the front of the jersey, gold names and numbers, and a gold "V-net" logo on the left leg of the shorts.

CavFanatic uniforms
From the 2008–09 to the 2011–12 season, the Cavaliers wore special "mash-up" uniforms – combining the style from one era with the color scheme of another – on select "CavFanatic Nights."

2008–09: The team wore the original "feathered C" uniforms, but with the 1994–2003 shade of blue combined with the classic wine-and-gold coloring.
2009–10: The team wore their 1987–89 uniforms, but in the classic wine and gold from the "Miracle of Richfield" era.
2010–11: The team wore the 2005–10 checkerboard alternate uniforms, but in the 1994–2003 color scheme of blue, black and orange.
2011–12: The team wore navy uniforms with wine-and-gold lettering; these were similar to the 2014–17 navy alternates, but with a different jersey and shorts striping.

"City Edition" uniforms
Nike also provides a fourth uniform known as the "City Edition," which honors the city of Cleveland as well as the state of Ohio:
 For the 2017–18 season, the "City Edition" uniform was gray with dark gray trim and had "The Land" (a popular Cleveland nickname) across the front of the jersey in white letters and trimmed in dark gray and gold (as is the number on the front of the jersey), with the player's name and number in white lettering on the back.
 For the 2018–19 season, the "City Edition" uniform was orange and blue (a nod to the popular Cavs teams of the 1980s) in a zigzag/slash pattern (reminiscent of the '90s-era uniforms) with white letters and numbers, and featured a script "Cleveland" across the front of the jersey. On the right pant leg, an outline of the Great Lakes (with Lake Erie highlighted) is featured with the slogan "1 OUT OF 5 GREATS." For the home games in which these uniforms were worn, the floor at Quicken Loans Arena was modified with an orange and blue design, as well. The same uniform design of the "City Edition" uniform was used for the team's "Earned Edition" uniform (exclusive to the 2018 NBA playoff teams), except the top part was white, while the bottom was powder blue and featured navy letters and numbers.
 For the 2019–20 season, the "City Edition" uniform was navy blue (a nod to the team's mid- to late-2000s alternate uniform) with "CLE" in gold letters (in the style of the team's original 1970 uniforms) and the numbers in gold with a wine inlay (in the style of the '90s uniforms), and wine, gold, white and black stripes down the sides. Additionally, to commemorate the team's 50th anniversary season, Nike provided a fifth uniform known as the "Classic Edition," which was a modified version of the team's mid-'90s-era black, blue and orange uniforms.
 For the 2020–21 season, the "City Edition" uniform was black with wine-and-gold trim around the neck and sleeves and white letters and numbers. "CLEVELAND" was featured on the front of the jersey, with each letter in a different font to represent both the Cavs and various artists and bands that have been inducted in the Rock and Roll Hall of Fame, as well as various patches down the sides of the pant legs. The jersey design is in honor of a partnership between the Cavs and the Rock and Roll Hall of Fame, who are collaborating on a "Cleveland Amplified" exhibit at the Rock Hall. The letters represent: "C" (Cleveland Cavaliers), "L" (Sex Pistols), "E" (The Who), "V" (David Bowie), "E" (Metallica), "L" (The Beatles), "A" (Nirvana), "N" (N.W.A) and "D" (Pink Floyd).
 For the 2021–22 season, the "City Edition" uniform was in the team's traditional wine color with gold letters and numbers; wine, gold and white trim around the sleeves and going down the pant legs; and a mix of the team's logos through its history all throughout the uniform. On the front of the jersey is the team's original 1970s "swashbuckler" logo, with the numbers in the style of the team's 1990s uniforms. On the pants, the team's 1980s logo is on the waistband, the '90s logo is on the left leg and the modern-era "C" logo is on the right leg.
 For the 2022–23 season, the "City Edition" uniform is white with tan lettering and numbers and accents of light blue, in honor of the Cleveland Metroparks. The jerseys read "The Land" across the chest, with a light blue circle featuring the Cavs' "C" logo placed between the "L" and "A," similar to how the "V" in the script Cavs logo is used as a basketball hoop.

Home arenas

 Cleveland Arena (1970–1974)
 Coliseum at Richfield (1974–1994)
 Rocket Mortgage FieldHouse (1994–present)

Cleveland Clinic Courts
Cleveland Clinic Courts, the team's practice facility and team headquarters, is located in suburban Independence. The  building opened in 2007 and includes two full-size basketball courts, a weight room, a team room, offices, medical facilities, and kitchen and dining facilities. Naming rights are held by the Cleveland Clinic, which is the team's official healthcare partner. Prior to the opening of Cleveland Clinic Courts, the team used the practice court located on the club level of Rocket Mortgage FieldHouse. In honor of the Cavs winning the NBA Championship, the city of Independence renamed the section of Brecksville Road leading to the team's practice facility "Cavaliers Way" in November 2016.

Players

Current roster

Retained draft rights
The Cavaliers hold the draft rights to the following unsigned draft picks who have been playing outside the NBA. A drafted player – either an international draftee or a college draftee who is not signed by the team that drafted him – is allowed to sign with any non-NBA teams. In this case, the team retains the player's draft rights in the NBA until one year after the player's contract with the non-NBA team ends. This list includes draft rights that were acquired from trades with other teams.

Cavs Legends
The following is a list of past Cavaliers players and other personnel who have been honored as "Cavs Legends" – either by retiring their number or having commemorative banners placed in the rafters at Rocket Mortgage FieldHouse.

 The NBA retired Bill Russell's No. 6 for all its member teams on August 11, 2022.

Wall of Honor
In 2019, the Cavaliers introduced the Wall of Honor, which honors former players and other personnel, and is located in the newly added North Atrium of the renovated Rocket Mortgage FieldHouse.

The inaugural class of Wall of Honor inductees included all personnel (players, coaches, executives, etc.) who have had their number retired or were honored with similar banners in the rafters, as well as the following:
 Original owner Nick Mileti
 Original general manager/head coach Bill Fitch
 Former general manager Wayne Embry
 Former forward John Johnson
 Former forward/center John "Hot Rod" Williams

Another group of former Cavs personnel was added in 2022, including:
Former owner Gordon Gund
Former guard World B. Free
Former forward and longtime broadcaster Campy Russell
Former head coach Lenny Wilkens

Hall of Famers
The following is a list of players and other personnel who have spent at least part of their careers with the Cavaliers that have been inducted into the Naismith Memorial Basketball Hall of Fame.

Notes:
 1 In total, Wilkens was inducted into the Hall of Fame three times – as player, as coach and as a member of the 1992 Olympic team.
 2 In total, Daly was inducted into the Hall of Fame twice – as a coach and as a member of the 1992 Olympic team.
 3 Inducted as contributor for being the first African American to manage a team in the NBA.

Curt Gowdy Award winners

 Joe Tait – 2010 (team announcer 1970–1981; 1983–2011)

FIBA Hall of Famers

Notes:
 1 In total, Daly was inducted into the FIBA Hall of Fame twice – as coach and as a member of the 1992 Olympic team.

Individual records and accomplishments

Franchise leaders
Bold denotes still active with team. Italic denotes still active but not with team.

Points scored (regular season – as of April 1, 2022)

 LeBron James (23,119)
 Zydrunas Ilgauskas (10,616)
 Brad Daugherty (10,389)
 Austin Carr (10,265)
 Mark Price (9,543)
 Bingo Smith (9,513)
 Hot Rod Williams (8,504)
 Kyrie Irving (8,232)
 Larry Nance (7,257)
 Kevin Love (7,230)
 Campy Russell (6,588)
 World B. Free (6,329)
 Tristan Thompson (5,839)
 Terrell Brandon (5,793)
 Jim Chones (5,729)
 Danny Ferry (5,643)
 Mike Mitchell (5,217)
 Craig Ehlo (5,103)
 Phil Hubbard (4,962)
 Anderson Varejão (4,498)

Other statistics (regular season) (as of April 1, 2022)

Individual awards

NBA Most Valuable Player
 LeBron James – 2009, 2010

NBA Rookie of the Year
 LeBron James – 2004
 Kyrie Irving – 2012

NBA Coach of the Year
 Bill Fitch – 1976
 Mike Brown – 2009

NBA Executive of the Year
 Wayne Embry – 1992, 1998

NBA Sportsmanship Award
 Terrell Brandon – 1997

J. Walter Kennedy Citizenship Award
 Austin Carr – 1980
 Eric Snow – 2005
 Luol Deng – 2014
 LeBron James – 2017

NBA Finals Most Valuable Player
 LeBron James – 2016

NBA All-Rookie First Team
 Austin Carr – 1972
 Dwight Davis – 1973
 Brad Daugherty – 1987
 Ron Harper – 1987
 John Williams – 1987
 Zydrunas Ilgauskas – 1998
 Brevin Knight – 1998
 Andre Miller – 2000
 LeBron James – 2004
 Kyrie Irving – 2012
 Dion Waiters – 2013
 Evan Mobley – 2022 (rookie), 2023 (sophomore)

NBA All-Rookie Second Team
 Terrell Brandon – 1992
 Derek Anderson – 1998
 Cedric Henderson – 1998
 Chris Mihm – 2001
 Carlos Boozer – 2003
 Tristan Thompson – 2012
 Tyler Zeller – 2013
 Collin Sexton – 2019
 Isaac Okoro – 2021

All-NBA First Team
 Mark Price – 1993
 LeBron James – 2006, 2008, 2009, 2010, 2015, 2016, 2017, 2018

All-NBA Second Team
 LeBron James – 2005, 2007

All-NBA Third Team
 Mark Price – 1989, 1992, 1994
 Brad Daugherty – 1992
 Kyrie Irving – 2015

NBA All-Defensive First Team
 Larry Nance – 1989
 LeBron James – 2009, 2010

NBA All-Defensive Second Team
 Jim Brewer – 1976, 1977
 Jim Cleamons – 1976
 Larry Nance – 1992, 1993
 Bobby Phills – 1996
 Anderson Varejão – 2010

NBA All-Star Weekend

NBA All-Star Game
 John Johnson – 1971, 1972
 Butch Beard – 1972
 Austin Carr – 1974
 Campy Russell – 1979
 Mike Mitchell – 1981
 Brad Daugherty – 1988, 1989, 1991, 1992, 1993
 Larry Nance – 1989, 1993
 Mark Price – 1989, 1992, 1993, 1994
 Tyrone Hill – 1995
 Terrell Brandon – 1996, 1997
 Shawn Kemp – 1998*
 Žydrūnas Ilgauskas – 2003, 2005
 LeBron James – 2005*, 2006*, 2007*, 2008*, 2009*, 2010*, 2015*, 2016*, 2017*, 2018*
 Mo Williams – 2009
 Kyrie Irving – 2013, 2014*, 2015, 2017*
 Kevin Love – 2017, 2018
 Jarrett Allen – 2022
 Darius Garland – 2022
 Donovan Mitchell – 2023*

* Starter

NBA All-Star Game head coaches
 Lenny Wilkens – 1989
 Mike Brown – 2009 
 Tyronn Lue – 2016

NBA All-Star Game MVP
 LeBron James – 2006, 2008, 2018
 Kyrie Irving – 2014

Three-point Shootout
 Mark Price – 1988 (5th), 1990 (7th), 1993 (1st), 1994 (1st), 1995 (3rd)
 Craig Ehlo – 1990 (5th), 1992 (6th)
 Wesley Person – 2002 (2nd)
 Damon Jones – 2007 (5th)
 Daniel Gibson – 2008 (2nd), 2011 (5th)
 Kyrie Irving – 2013 (1st), 2014 (4th), 2015 (2nd), 2017 (2nd)

Slam Dunk Contest
 Roy Hinson – 1986 (7th)
 Ron Harper – 1987 (5th), 1989 (7th)
 Bob Sura – 1997 (5th)
 Larry Nance Jr. – 2018 (2nd)

Skills Challenge
 LeBron James – 2006 (2nd), 2007 (3rd)
 Mo Williams – 2009 (3rd)
 Kyrie Irving – 2012 (7th)
 Jarrett Allen – 2022 (1st)
 Darius Garland – 2022 (1st)
 Evan Mobley – 2022 (1st)

Rookie/Rising Stars Challenge
 Chris Mills – 1994
 Bob Sura – 1996
 Vitaly Potapenko – 1997
 Žydrūnas Ilgauskas – 1998 
 Brevin Knight – 1998
 Cedric Henderson – 1998
 Derek Anderson – 1998 (DNP)
 Andre Miller – 2000 (rookie), 2001 (sophomore)
 Chris Mihm – 2002 (sophomore)
 Carlos Boozer – 2003 (rookie), 2004 (sophomore)
 Dajuan Wagner – 2003 (rookie)
 LeBron James – 2004 (rookie), 2005 (sophomore)
 Daniel Gibson – 2008 (sophomore)
 Kyrie Irving  – 2012 (rookie), 2013 (sophomore)
 Tristan Thompson – 2012 (rookie), 2013 (sophomore)
 Dion Waiters – 2013 (rookie), 2014 (sophomore)
 Tyler Zeller – 2013 (rookie)
 Matthew Dellavedova – 2015 (World)
 Cedi Osman – 2018 (World)
 Collin Sexton – 2020 (sophomore)
 Evan Mobley – 2022 (rookie)
 Isaac Okoro – 2022 (sophomore)

Rookie/Rising Stars Challenge MVP
 Žydrūnas Ilgauskas – 1998
 Daniel Gibson – 2008 (sophomore)
 Kyrie Irving  – 2012 (rookie)

Two Ball Contest
 Wesley Person with Michelle Edwards – 1998 (7th)
 Trajan Langdon with Eva Nemcova – 2001 (2nd)

Head coaches

Media

Radio

WTAM (1100 AM/106.9 FM) and WMMS (100.7 FM) currently serve as the flagship stations for the Cavaliers AudioVerse. Tim Alcorn (play by play) and former Cavaliers star Jim Chones (analyst) are the radio team, with WTAM morning co-host/sports director Mike Snyder hosting the pregame/halftime/postgame shows. Former Ohio State standout and NBA player Brad Sellers joins Snyder for the postgame show.

WNZN 89.1 FM serves as the team's Spanish language outlet, with Rafael Hernandez Brito calling the games.

TV

The Cavaliers air on Bally Sports Ohio. The broadcast team includes play-by-play announcer John Michael, sideline reporter Serena Winters, and a rotation in the analyst spot of former Cavalier players Austin Carr and Brad Daugherty and former Cavs coach Mike Fratello.

Cayleigh Griffin and former Cavaliers forward Campy Russell (along with either Carr or Fratello when they are not serving as game analyst) host the pregame/halftime/postgame shows.

Mascots

Current
The Cavaliers have two official mascots: Moondog and Sir C.C. The former was inspired by Cleveland radio DJ Alan Freed, who popularized the phrase "rock and roll" and had called himself "Moondog." Moondog was an NBA All-Star selection in 2003 and 2004, and he made his first appearance on November 5, 2003. Sir C.C., a swashbuckler character, debuted during a game on November 27, 2010.

Past
During the 1990s and early 2000s, the Cavs had a polar bear mascot named Whammer, who was introduced on November 9, 1995. He still makes occasional appearances throughout the season at Cavaliers games.

References

External links

 

 
National Basketball Association teams
Basketball teams established in 1970
1970 establishments in Ohio
Rock Ventures